The Ministry of Environment and Natural Resources was a federal-level department that managed environmental reserves, rehabilitation, and natural resources (especially potable water, soil fertility, and the Caribbean coasts) in Venezuela. The last cabinet minister was Miguel Leonardo Rodríguez.

Ministers

See also 
 Cabinet of Hugo Chávez

References 

 Ministerio del Ambiente y de los Recursos Naturales — Official government ministerial portal.

Environment
Environment of Venezuela
Venezuela
Venezuela
Venezuela, Environment